The slender-billed curlew (Numenius tenuirostris) is a bird in the wader family Scolopacidae. Isotope analysis suggests the majority of the former population bred in the Kazakh Steppe despite a record from the Siberian swamps, and was migratory, formerly wintering in shallow freshwater habitats around the Mediterranean. This species has occurred as a vagrant in western Europe, the Canary Islands, the Azores, Oman, Canada, and Japan. The slender-billed curlew was always a rare species and is feared extinct, with the last verifiable sighting being in 1995.

Description 
 
The slender-billed curlew is a small curlew, 36–41 cm in length with a 77–88 cm wingspan. It is therefore about the same size as a Eurasian whimbrel, but it is more like the Eurasian curlew in plumage. The breeding adult is mainly greyish brown above, with a whitish rump and lower back. The underparts are whitish, heavily streaked with dark brown. The flanks have round or heart-shaped spots. The non-breeding plumage is similar, but with fewer flank spots. Male and female are alike in plumage, but females are longer-billed than males, an adaptation in curlew species that eliminates direct competition for food between the sexes. The juvenile plumage is very similar to the adult, but the flank are marked with brown streaking, the heart-shaped spots only appearing toward the end of the first winter.

Compared to the Eurasian curlew, the slender-billed curlew is whiter on the breast, tail, and underwing, and the bill is shorter, more slender, and slightly straighter at the base. The arrowhead-shaped flank spots of the Eurasian curlew also are different from the round or heart-shaped spots of the slender-billed. The head pattern, with a dark cap and whitish supercilium, recalls that of the whimbrel, but that species also has a central crown stripe and a more clearly marked pattern overall; the pattern of the slender-billed curlew would be hard to make out in the field.

This species shows more white than other curlews; however, the white underwing has been stressed too much as a relevant identification criteria along with the distinctive flank markings of adults (not helpful in juvenile and 1st year bird before post-juvenile moult). The most recent and most updated identification's paper, reports as clinching characters the uniformly dark underside of 4 to 6 outer primaries (the wing-tip or "hand"), the black (adults) or anyway daker (juvenile and 1st y bird) legs, and the white tail with fewer dark bars (Corso et al., 2014).

Vocalisations 
The call is a cour-lee, similar to that of the Eurasian curlew, but higher-pitched, more melodic, and shorter. The alarm call is a fast cu-ee.

Distribution

The slender-billed curlew was only known to breed in a small region north of Omsk, Russia in a period between 1909 and 1925. 
In recent history, it mostly migrated to the Mediterranean as well as southern Arabia, with claims in the northern reaches of the Persian gulf, in Kuwait and Iraq. There have been historical records of the bird elsewhere, as in an ornithological dictionary of Gibraltar, written in 1895, it indirectly states that the slender-billed curlew was recorded as a passage migrant in Malaga, Spain.

Behaviour 

Little is known about the breeding biology, but on average the few nests observed had four eggs.

Slender-billed curlews feed by using their bills to probe soft mud for small invertebrates, but will also pick other small items off the surface if the opportunity arises. It used to be highly gregarious outside the breeding season, associating with related species, particularly Eurasian curlews.

Status 
 
After a long period of steady decline, the slender-billed curlew is extremely rare, with only a minute and still declining population. This is thought to be fewer than 50 adult birds, with the last verified sighting in 2004. As a result, it is now listed as critically endangered. However, for most specialists of the species, it is most probably extinct now (Corso et al., 2014; Kirwan et al., 2015). Indeed, all records from 1990 until today are not considered reliable and acceptable on stricter criteria. 

The primary cause of the decline is thought to be excessive hunting on the Mediterranean wintering grounds. Habitat loss, particularly in the wintering grounds, may also have played a part, but huge areas of forest bogs suitable for breeding still exist in Siberia. It is unknown to what extent the birds still reproduce successfully, and how much gene flow still exists in what may once have been a large and widely dispersed population undergoing little purging of deleterious recessive alleles and consequently with a high MVP. Furthermore, there is evidence that birds in winter quarters were more numerous once, and in general not a very rare sight in Western Europe in the nineteenth century, where they were hunted with some regularity. Later on they were additionally threatened by pollution, e.g. oil spills. There are no data about how these threats endanger the species today. Theoretically, they might have retreated to all but inaccessible areas, but then, a single hunter or fox might unwittingly wipe out enough of the few remaining birds to doom the species.

The last well-documented nest was found in 1924, near Tara in Omsk oblast, Siberia.
Its nesting grounds since then remain unknown, despite several intensive searches (not surprising, with more than 100,000 square kilometres to search). The extent of its decline also is reflected in the absence of wintering birds at previously regular Moroccan sites.

More recently, 20 birds were recorded in Italy in 1995, but this  most unbelievable record is now confirmed to be referred to Numenius arquata orientalis as both photographs and sound recordings shown (Kirwan et al., 2015). There was a potential record of an immature (one year old) at Druridge Pools in Northumberland, England, on 4–7 May 1998, for details of which see the Druridge Bay curlew. The bird was initially accepted onto the British List but was removed in 2013 following a review of the identification.

Slender-billed curlews have been reported in various Western Palearctic locations on a number of occasions since the Druridge bird, including claimed, but unverified, sightings of single birds from Italy and Greece; none have been documented with conclusive photographs and at least one claimed bird, at RSPB Minsmere, Suffolk, England, in 2004, is now widely believed to have been a Eurasian curlew.
 
Further sourced reports of the species were published in 2007, in British Birds magazine; the article stated, quoting from Zhmud:

During the last few years, small groups of birds have been found in the northern coastal areas [of the Danube Delta], frequenting low-lying islands, bays, and sand-spits covered with Common Glasswort Salicornia europaea [...] Four birds were present from 25 July to 21 August 2003, six were seen on 11 August 2004, and another on 12 August 2004.

A sighting of a single bird was reported from Albania in 2006 by a team including ornithologists from the environmental organization EuroNatur.

Thus, although hard proof is lacking, but given the extent of possible habitat and the precautionary principle, it is believed to be extant for the time being. Apparently at least the wintering range has starkly contracted; it appears that the handful of family or neighbour groups that are left retreat to remote habitat in southeastern Europe in winter. The IUCN classifies it as Critically Endangered (CR) C2a(ii); D. This means that an estimated 50 mature birds or fewer are believed to exist, with numbers declining, and that there probably is only one subpopulation.

References

General references 
 Hayman, Peter; Marchant, John & Prater, Tony (1986). Shorebirds: an identification guide to the waders of the world. Houghton Mifflin, Boston. 

 Svensson, Lars; Zetterström, Dan; Mullarney, Killian & Grant, P. J. (1999). Collins bird guide. Harper & Collins, London. 
 Corso, Andrea; Jansen, Justin; Kokay, Szabolcs (2014). "A review of the identification criteria and variability of the Slender-billed Curlew." British Bird 107: 339–370.   https://www.researchgate.net/publication/269160426_A_review_of_the_identification_criteria_and_variability_of_the_Slender-billed_Curlew

Identification

Corso, Andrea; Jansen, Justin; Kokay, Szabolcs (2014). "A review of the identification criteria and variability of the Slender-billed Curlew." British Bird 107: 339–370. https://www.researchgate.net/publication/269160426_A_review_of_the_identification_criteria_and_variability_of_the_Slender-billed_Curlew
 Identification of Slender-billed Curlew, John Marchant, British Birds 77: 135–140.
 Slender-billed Curlew studies, Richard Porter, British Birds 77: 581–586.
 Habitat of Slender-billed Curlews in Morocco, Arnoud van den Berg, British Birds 83: 1–7.
 Slender-billed Curlew in Tunisia in Feb 1984, Eddy Wijmengs & Klaas van Dijk, Dutch Birding 7: 67–68.
 Slender-billed Curlews in Morocco in Feb 1979, Peter Ewins, Dutch Birding 11: 119–120.
 Identification of Slender-billed Curlew and its occurrence in Morocco in winter 1987/88, Arnoud van den Berg, Dutch Birding 10: 45–53.
 Slender-billed Curlew on Sicily in March 1996, Andrea Corso, Dutch Birding 18: 302.
 Slender-billed Curlew collected at Canis-vliet in September 1896, Gunter De Smet, Dutch Birding 19: 230–232.
 The identification of the Slender-billed Curlew, British Birds Vol 56 No8 1963
 Kirwan, Guy; Porter, Richard; Scott, Derek (2015). Chronicle of an extinction? A review of Slender-billed Curlew records in the Middle East. "British Birds" 108: 669–682.

Specific references

External links
ARKive: Photographs of Slender-billed Curlew (Numenius tenuirostris). Retrieved 2007-APR-06.
 BirdLife International: Species factsheet. Retrieved 2007-APR-06.
 BirdLife International: Additional data. Retrieved 2007-APR-06.
 British Ornithologists' Union Records Committee: Slender-billed Curlew at Druridge Pools accepted as first for Britain (with photo). Retrieved 2007-APR-06.
Photos from Morocco. Retrieved 2007-APR-06.
 The RSPB project: Slender-billed Curlew.
 Surfbirds.com: The Slender-billed Curlew in Northumberland, 1998 – 'plate 164' – response by the British Birds Rarities Committee and more photos of the "Druridge Bay curlew". Retrieved 2007-APR-06.
 Convention on Migratory Species: Slender-billed Curlew Memorandum of Understanding
 CIC – International Council for Game and Wildlife Conservation: CIC Species Conservation: Slender-billed Curlew

slender-billed curlew
Birds of Russia
Birds of Central Asia
Birds of North Africa
slender-billed curlew
slender-billed curlew